Lovisa Christina Charlotta "Lotten" Edholm or af Edholm, née von Heijne (18 April 1839 - 12 July 1930) was a Swedish composer and a pioneer within the Swedish Red Cross.

She was born to the nobleman Georg Fredrik von Heijne-Lillienberg and Juliana Charlotta Silfverstolpe, and married Edvard Edholm (1831-1913), physician to the king, in 1867. She served as hovfröken (maid of honour) to the queen dowager Josephine in 1865-67.

Lotten Edholm initiated the participation of women in Sweden in the Swedish Red Cross and served as chair of the women's section of the Swedish Red Cross in 1865-1906. She also started a cooking school in Stockholm. Lotten Edholm was also active as a composer and composed piano music for private use in high society life.

In 1919, she published her memoirs, Från barndom till ålderdom (From Childhood to Old Age).

References
 Svensk uppslagsbok. Malmö 1937.
 Lotten af Edholm på Levande Musikarv

Further reading 
 

1839 births
1930 deaths
19th-century composers
19th-century Swedish people
Swedish memoirists
Swedish ladies-in-waiting
19th-century classical composers
Women classical composers
Romantic composers
Swedish classical composers
Swedish women composers
19th-century Swedish musicians
Women memoirists
19th-century Swedish women musicians
20th-century women composers
19th-century women composers
20th-century Swedish women